For a Friend: The Best of Bronski Beat, The Communards & Jimmy Somerville is a 34-track, 2-CD greatest hits compilation and career retrospective by Jimmy Somerville, featuring his work as a solo artist, as well as with Bronski Beat and The Communards. It is also known as Small Town Boy: The Best of Bronski Beat, The Communards & Jimmy Somerville.

The compilation was released in 2009, and spans twenty five years of Somerville's career. It begins with Bronski Beat's 1984 hit "Smalltown Boy", and concludes with tracks from Somerville's 2009 album Suddenly Last Summer, which features stripped down covers of songs Somerville considered formative. It includes ten UK top twenty hits including "Smalltown Boy" (Bronski Beat: UK #3, 1984), "Don't Leave Me This Way" (The Commundards: UK #1, 1986), and "You Make Me Feel (Mighty Real)" (Jimmy Somerville: UK #5, 1989).

Track listing

Disc 1

Disc 2

References

Jimmy Somerville compilation albums
Bronski Beat albums
The Communards albums
2009 greatest hits albums